Sylvain Geboers (born 28 March 1945) is a Belgian former professional motocross racer and motocross racing team manager. He competed in the Motocross World Championships from 1968 to 1977.

Motocross career
Geboers was born in Mol, Belgium. He was one of the top motocross racers of the late 1960s and early 1970s, finishing in the top three of the F.I.M. 250cc motocross World Championships for five consecutive years from 1968 to 1972. Although he was often overshadowed by his ČZ and Suzuki teammate, Joël Robert, he was a respected competitor known as a sand track specialist.

Geboers played an integral role in the introduction of the sport of motocross in the United States by participating in the fledgling AMA Trans-AMA Motocross Series. The championship was an international series established by the American Motorcyclist Association as a pilot event to help establish motocross in the United States. He won the 1971 Trans-AMA motocross series championship. Geboers was also a multi-time Motocross des Nations and Trophee des Nations champion.

After retiring from professional racing in 1977, Geboers managed Suzuki's European motocross team until 2016 when, he turned over his duties to Stefan Everts. As team manager, he guided Eric Geboers, Georges Jobé, Greg Albertyn, Donny Schmit, Mickaël Pichon, Steve Ramon and Stefan Everts to world championships. A

References

1945 births
People from Mol, Belgium
People from Balen
Sportspeople from Antwerp Province
Flemish sportspeople
Belgian motocross riders
Motorcycle racing team owners
Living people